Symphyotrichum eatonii (formerly Aster eatonii) is a species of aster known by the common name Eaton's aster. It is native to much of western North America from British Columbia to Saskatchewan, the Sierra Nevada in California, the Rocky Mountains region, to Arizona and New Mexico, where it grows in many habitats, especially wet areas such as meadows and near ditches.

Description
Symphyotrichum eatonii is a perennial herb growing  from a short rhizome. Some of the leaves and the upper parts of the stem are hairy.

The inflorescence holds several flower heads containing many white to pink ray florets around a center of yellow disk florets. The fruit is a hairy cypsela that resembles an achene.

Taxonomy
Symphyotrichum eatonii is classified in the subgenus Symphyotrichum, section Occidentales.  Catalogue of Life, Flora of North America, and Jepson eFlora accepted this species as Symphyotrichum bracteolatum, while POWO, NatureServe, and Canadian botanist John C. Semple circumscribed to S. eatonii.

Citations

References

External links
 

eatonii
Flora of the Western United States
Flora of Western Canada
Flora of the Sierra Nevada (United States)
Flora of the Rocky Mountains
Flora of the South-Central United States
Taxa named by Asa Gray
Plants described in 1884